"Swish" (stylized in all uppercase) is a song by the American rapper Tyga from his seventh album Legendary. It was released by Last Kings Music and Empire Distribution on July 25, 2018,  the album's second single.

Charts

Certifications

References

2018 singles
2018 songs
Songs written by Tyga
Songs written by D.A. Got That Dope
Empire Distribution singles
Tyga songs